is a retired Japanese tennis player.

On 22 August 2005, Fujiwara reached her best singles ranking of world No. 84. On 11 November 2002, she peaked at No. 13 in the WTA doubles rankings.

At the 2002 Australian Open, Fujiwara partnered with Shinobu Asagoe and advanced to the quarterfinals, where they lost against eventual champions Martina Hingis and Anna Kournikova. The same year, Fujiwara and Ai Sugiyama reached the French Open doubles semifinals, losing to Lisa Raymond and Rennae Stubbs in three sets.

Playing for Japan Fed Cup team, Fujiwara has a win–loss record of 23–5.

WTA career finals

Doubles: 6 (1 title, 5 runner-ups)

ITF Circuit finals

Singles (9–8)

Doubles (36–25)

Performance timelines

Singles

Doubles

Notes

References

External links

 
 
 

1981 births
Living people
Japanese female tennis players
Sportspeople from Tokyo
Sportspeople from Kanagawa Prefecture
20th-century Japanese women
21st-century Japanese women